Emmi Louise Walther (30 October 1860, Hamburg - 11 September 1936, Dachau) was a German painter, graphic artist and watercolorist. Most of her works are in the Art Nouveau or Symbolist styles.

Biography 
She was born to a middle-class family and received her first art training from the landscape painter, Friedrich Schwinge. Later, she studied in Hannover, but did not become seriously interested in an artistic career until she was thirty. In 1896, she went to Munich, where she enrolled in the private painting school operated by Ludwig Schmid-Reutte.

After completing her studies there, she moved to the artists' colony at Dachau and worked with Adolf Hölzel. While there, she became friends with Emil Nolde and travelled to Paris with him, by way of Amsterdam, where she took classes at the short-lived Académie Carmen; making friends with Alphonse Mucha, Paula Becker and Clara Westhoff. After 1900, she spent time at the artists' colonies in Concarneau and Worpswede; staying with Becker, who had married the painter, Otto Modersohn.

After 1916, she became a permanent resident of Dachau. Three years later, she was one of the founding members of the Künstlervereinigung Dachau (Artists' Association), which still exists. A street there has been named after her.

References

Writings 
 Heimat der Seele (Home of the Soul) – Stimmungen in Wort u. Bild, 1922, Kostanz, R. Walther und Leipzig, H. G. Wallmann  
 Von Tag zu Tage (From Day to Day) – Stimmungen in Wort u. Bild, 1925, Kostanz, R. Walther

Further reading 
 Elisabeth Wirtz: In: Katalog zur Gedächtnisausstellung Emmi Walther 1860–1936 im Rahmen der Sommerausstellung der Künstlervereinigung Dachau e.V. im Schloß zu Dachau, vom 20. Juni bis Anfang Oktober 1937.
 Ottilie Thiemann-Stoedtner, Gerhard Hanke: Dachauer Maler. Die Kunstlandschaft von 1801-1946. 2. Aufl. Dachau 1989, S. 272, 284, 352.

External links 

 Emmi Walther @ Bildindex der Kunst und Architektur

1860 births
1936 deaths
19th-century German painters
20th-century German painters
20th-century German women artists
19th-century German women artists
German women painters
Artists from Hamburg
Art Nouveau painters
Symbolist artists
Académie Carmen alumni